This is a 'list of high schools in the state of Arizona.

Apache County

Ganado High School, Ganado
Many Farms High School, Many Farms
Red Mesa High School, Teec Nos Pos
Red Valley/Cove High School, Red Valley
Rock Point Community School, Rock Point
Round Valley High School, Eagar
St. Michael Indian School, St. Michaels
Valley High School, Sanders
Window Rock High School, Fort Defiance

Chinle

Chinle High School
Rough Rock Community School

St. Johns

New Visions Academy 
St. Johns High School

Cochise County

Bisbee High School, Bisbee
Bowie High School, Bowie
San Simon School, San Simon
St. David High School, St. David
Tombstone High School, Tombstone
Valley Union High School, Elfrida
Willcox High School, Willcox

Benson

Benson High School
Grace Christian Academy

Douglas

Center for Academic Success-Douglas
Douglas High School

Sierra Vista

Berean Academy
Buena High School
Center for Academic Success-Sierra Vista
Veritas Christian Community School

Coconino County

Fredonia High School, Fredonia
Grand Canyon High School, Grand Canyon
Williams High School, Williams

Flagstaff

Basis Schools Flagstaff
Coconino High School
Flagstaff Arts and Leadership Academy
Flagstaff High School
Northland Preparatory Academy
Ponderosa High School

Page

Page High School
Tse'Yaato' High School

Tuba City

Greyhills Academy High School
Tuba City High School

Gila County

Hayden High School, Winkelman
Miami High School, Miami
San Carlos High School, San Carlos
Young Public School, Young

Globe

Globe High School
Liberty High School

Payson

New Visions Academy
Payson High School

Graham County

Fort Thomas High School, Fort Thomas
Pima High School, Pima
Thatcher High School, Thatcher

Safford

Mount Graham High School
Safford High School

Greenlee County

Duncan High School, Duncan
Morenci Junior/Senior High School, Morenci

La Paz County

Parker High School, Parker
Salome High School, Salome

Maricopa County

Arizona Agribusiness and Equine Center, multiple locations
Basis Schools, multiple locations
Cactus Shadows High School, Cave Creek
Canyon View High School, Waddell
Dysart High School, El Mirage
e-Institute Charter High School, multiple locations
Fountain Hills High School, Fountain Hills
Gila Bend High School, Gila Bend
Intelli-School, multiple locations
Leading Edge Academy, multiple locations
Phoenix Country Day School, Paradise Valley
Tonopah Valley High School, Tonopah

Anthem

Anthem Preparatory Academy
Boulder Creek High School

Avondale

Agua Fria High School
Estrella High School
La Joya Community High School
St. John Paul II Catholic High School
West Point High School
Westview High School

Buckeye

Buckeye Union High School
The Odyssey Institute for Advanced and International Studies
Skyview High School
Verrado High School
Youngker High School

Chandler

Arizona College Preparatory
AZ Compass Prep School
Basha High School
Basis Schools Chandler
Chandler High School
Chandler Preparatory Academy
El Dorado High School
Hamilton High School
Lincoln Preparatory Academy
Paragon Science Academy
Primavera Online High School
Seton Catholic Preparatory High School
Tri-City Christian Academy
Valley Christian High School

Gilbert

American Leadership Academy Gilbert North
Apollo High School
Campo Verde High School
Desert Hills High School
Eduprize Gilbert
Gilbert Christian High School
Gilbert Classical Academy
Gilbert Global Academy 
Gilbert High School
Highland High School
Higley High School
Learning Foundation and Performing Arts School-Gilbert Campus
Mesquite High School
Perry High School
San Tan Charter School
Williams Field High School

Glendale

Arrowhead Christian Academy
Cactus High School
Copper Canyon High School
Deer Valley High School
Desert Heights Preparatory Academy 
Dream City Christian School
Glendale High School
Independence High School
Ironwood High School
Mountain Ridge High School
Raymond S. Kellis High School
Western Maricopa Education Center

Goodyear

Desert Edge High School
Estrella Foothills High School
Millennium High School
Trivium Prep Academy

Laveen

Betty H. Fairfax High School
César Chávez High School
Country Gardens Charter School
Heritage Academy (Laveen)

Mesa

Academy With Community Partners
Arete Preparatory Academy
Basis Schools Mesa
Canyon Valley School
Desert Ridge High School
Dobson High School
East Valley Academy
East Valley High School
East Valley Institute of Technology
Eastmark High School
Faith Christian School
Heritage Academy
Mesa High School
Mountain View High School
Red Mountain High School
Redeemer Christian School
Riverview High School
Sequoia Charter School
Skyline High School
Sun Valley High School
Superstition High School
Westwood High School

Peoria

Centennial High School
Glendale Preparatory Academy
Liberty High School
Peoria Accelerated High School
Peoria High School
Sunrise Mountain High School

Phoenix
Phoenix Union High School District

Alhambra High School
Bioscience High School
Bostrom High School
Browne High School
Camelback High School
Central High School
Desiderata Program
Franklin Police and Fire High School
Hayden High School
Linda Abril Educational Academy
Maryvale High School
Metro Tech High School
North High School
South Mountain High School

Other Public Schools

Arcadia High School (Scottsdale Unified)
Barry Goldwater High School (Deer Valley)
Cortez High School (Glendale Union)
Desert Vista High School (Tempe Union)
Greenway High School (Glendale Union)
Metrocenter Academy (Glendale Union)
Moon Valley High School (Glendale Union)
Mountain Pointe High School (Tempe Union)
North Canyon High School (Paradise Valley)
Paradise Valley High School (Paradise Valley)
Phoenix College Preparatory Academy (Maricopa Community College District)
Pinnacle High School (Paradise Valley)
Sandra Day O'Connor High School (Deer Valley)
Shadow Mountain High School (Paradise Valley)
Sierra Linda High School (Tolleson Union)
Sunnyslope High School (Glendale Union)
Thunderbird High School (Glendale Union)
Washington High School (Glendale Union)

Charter Schools

Arizona Collegiate Charter High School
Arizona Conservatory for Arts & Academics
Arizona Preparatory Academy 
Arizona School for the Arts
ASU Prep-Phoenix High School
Career Success Schools
Cornerstone High School 
Crestview College Preparatory High School
Crown Point High School
Deer Valley Academy
Desert Garden Montessori
Desert Marigold School
GateWay Early College High School
Genesis Academy
Girls Leadership Academy of Arizona
Glenview College Preparatory High School
Hope High School
Horizon Community Learning Center
Insight Academy of Arizona
Jefferson Preparatory High School
Madison Highland Prep
Maya High School
Metropolitan Arts Institute
NFL YET
North Phoenix Preparatory Academy
North Pointe Preparatory
Pan-American Charter School
Premier High School
RSD High School
Skyline Prep High School
Sonoran Science Academy
South Pointe High School
South Ridge High School
Southwest Leadership Academy
Summit High School
Veritas Preparatory Academy
West Phoenix High School
Western School of Science and Technology

Religious Schools

91st Psalm Christian School
Arizona Cultural Academy
Arizona Lutheran Academy
Bourgade Catholic High School
Brophy College Preparatory
Holy Family Academy
Northwest Christian High School
Paradise Valley Christian Prep
Phoenix Christian High School
St. Mary's High School
Scottsdale Christian Academy
Shearim Torah High School
Valley Lutheran High School
Xavier College Preparatory
Yeshiva High School of Arizona

Queen Creek

American Leadership Academy
Benjamin Franklin Charter High School
Canyon State Academy
Casteel High School
Heritage Academy (Queen Creek)
Queen Creek High School

Scottsdale

BASIS Scottsdale
Bella Vista Private School
Chaparral High School
Cicero Preparatory Academy
Desert Mountain High School
Gateway Academy
Horizon High School
Notre Dame Preparatory High School
Rancho Solano Preparatory High School
Saguaro High School
Salt River High School
Scottsdale Preparatory Academy
Thunderbird Adventist Academy
Ville de Marie Academy

Surprise

Arizona Charter Academy
Coronado High School
Imagine Prep at Surprise
Paradise Honors High School
Shadow Ridge High School
Valley Vista High School
Willow Canyon High School

Tempe

Compadre Academy
Corona del Sol High School
James Madison Preparatory School
Marcos de Niza High School
McClintock High School
The New School for the Arts and Academics
Pinnacle High School
Student Choice High School
Tempe Accelerated High School
Tempe High School
Tempe Preparatory Academy

Tolleson

Tolleson Union High School
University High School

Wickenburg

Wickenburg Christian Academy
Wickenburg High School

Mohave County

Beaver Dam High School, Beaver Dam
El Capitan, Colorado City
Lake Havasu High School, Lake Havasu City
River Valley High School, Mohave Valley

Bullhead City

Mohave Accelerated Learning Center
Mohave High School

Kingman

Kingman Academy of Learning
Kingman High School
Lee Williams High School

Navajo County

Blue Ridge High School, Lakeside
Cibecue Community School (Dishchii'bikoh), Cibecue
Holbrook High School, Holbrook
Hopi Junior/Senior High School, Keams Canyon
Joseph City High School, Joseph City
Mogollon High School, Heber
Monument Valley High School, Kayenta
Pinon High School, Pinon
Shonto Preparatory Technology High School, Shonto
Show Low High School, Show Low
Winslow High School, Winslow

Snowflake

Northern Arizona Vocational Institute of Technology
Snowflake High School

Whiteriver

Alchesay High School
East Fork Lutheran School

Pima County

Ajo High School, Ajo
Basis Schools (Oro Valley, Tucson North)
Catalina Foothills High School, Catalina Foothills
Cienega High School, Vail

Marana

Marana High School
MCAT High School 
Mountain View High School

Oro Valley

Basis Schools Oro Valley
Canyon del Oro High School
Immaculate Heart High School
Ironwood Ridge High School

Sahuarita

Edge High School (Sahuarita campus)
Sahuarita High School
Walden Grove High School

Sells

Baboquivari High School
Tohono O'odham High School

Tucson
Public/Magnet Schools

Amphitheater High School
Andrada Polytechnic High School
Catalina Magnet High School
Cholla High Magnet School
Desert View High School
Edge High School (Himmel Park and Northwest campuses)
Empire High School
Flowing Wells High School
Mary Meredith K-12 School
Mica Mountain High School
Palo Verde High School
Pantano High School
Pima Vocational High School
Pueblo Magnet High School
Rincon High School
Sabino High School
Sahuaro High School
Santa Rita High School
Sentinel Peak High School
Sunnyside High School
Tanque Verde High School
Tucson High Magnet School
University High School
Vail Academy and High School

Charter Schools

Academy of Tucson
Accelerated Learning Laboratory
Alta Vista High School
Canyon Rose Academy
Changemaker High School
City High School
Compass High School
Desert Rose Academy Charter School
Hiaki High School
Mountain Rose Academy
Nosotros Academy
Pima Partnership High School
Pima Rose Academy
Presidio School
Project MORE High School
Sonoran Science Academy (Tucson, Davis-Monthan)
Southern Arizona Community Academy
Southgate Academy
Toltecalli High School
Tucson International Academy
Tucson Preparatory School

Private Schools

Desert Christian High School
The Gregory School
Pusch Ridge Christian Academy
St. Augustine Catholic High School
Salpointe Catholic High School
San Miguel High School

Pinal County

Ray High School, Kearny
San Manuel Junior/Senior High School, San Manuel
Santa Cruz Valley Union High School, Eloy
Superior Junior/Senior High School, Superior

Apache Junction

Apache Junction High School
Apache Trail High School
Imagine Prep Superstition

Casa Grande

Casa Grande Union High School
Casa Verde High School
Mission Heights Preparatory High School
Pinnacle High School
Vista Grande High School

Coolidge

CAVIT
Coolidge High School
Imagine Prep at Coolidge

Florence

Florence Baptist Academy
Florence High School

Maricopa

Maricopa High School
Pathway Academy

San Tan Valley

American Leadership Academy
Combs High School
Poston Butte High School
San Tan Foothills High School

Santa Cruz County

Patagonia Union High School, Patagonia
Rio Rico High School, Rio Rico

Nogales

Lourdes Catholic School
Nogales High School
Pierson Vocational High School
Charter High School

Yavapai County

Ash Fork High School, Ash Fork
Bagdad High School, Bagdad
Camp Verde High School, Camp Verde
Chino Valley High School, Chino Valley
Seligman High School, Seligman
Spring Ridge Academy, Spring Valley

Cottonwood

American Heritage Academy Cottonwood
Mingus Union High School
Valley Academy for Career and Technology Education

Mayer

Mayer High School
The Orme School

Prescott

Basis Schools Prescott
Northpoint Expeditionary Learning Academy
Prescott High School
Tri-City College Prep High School

Prescott Valley

Arizona Agribusiness and Equine Center (Prescott Valley branch)
Bradshaw Mountain High School
Canyon View Preparatory Academy
Mingus Mountain Academy
Pace Preparatory Academy
Yavapai County High School

Rimrock

Sedona Sky Academy
Southwestern Academy

Sedona

Sedona Red Rock High School
Verde Valley School

Yuma County

Antelope Union High School, Wellton
PPEP TEC High Schools (Cesar Chavez, Jose Yepez)
San Luis High School, San Luis

Yuma

Aztec High School
Carpe Diem e-Learning Community
Cibola High School
Gila Ridge High School
Harvest Preparatory Academy
Kofa High School
Southwest Technical Education District of Yuma
Vista Alternative High School
Yuma Catholic High School
Yuma High School

Defunct schoolsSchools in this section are listed with their years of closure in parentheses.''
Alhambra College Preparatory High School, Phoenix (2011)
Calli Ollin High School, Tucson (2010)
Carver High School (also known as Phoenix Union Colored High School), Phoenix (Black; 1954)
Catalina Mountain School, Tucson (2011)
Clarkdale High School, Clarkdale (1951)
Clifton High School, Clifton (2012)
Cottonwood High School, Cottonwood (1958; consolidated into Mingus Union High School)
East High School, Phoenix (1985)
Gerard Catholic High School, Phoenix (1989)
Gila Preparatory Academy, Safford (2011)
Guadalupe Regional High School (also known as Guadalupe Satellite at Compadre High School), Guadalupe (2007)
Jerome High School, Jerome (1951)
Jess Schwartz Jewish Community High School, Phoenix (2011)
Jokake School for Girls, Scottsdale (1945)
Judson School, Scottsdale (2000)
Litchfield Park High School, Litchfield Park (1956; moved to Avondale and became Agua Fria High School)
McNary High School, McNary (1980)
Mesa Central High School/Mesa Vo-Tech High School, Mesa (1991)
Mesa Ranch School, Mesa (1943)
Music Mountain Junior/Senior High School, Peach Springs
Northern Yuma County Union High School, Parker/Salome (circa mid-1950s; split into two schools)
Palo Verde Christian High School, Tucson (2000; acquired and renamed Pusch Ridge Christian Academy)
Phoenix Indian School, Phoenix (1990)
Phoenix Technical School, Phoenix (1955; folded back into Phoenix Union)
Phoenix Union Cyber High School, Phoenix (2010; folded into Camelback High School)
Phoenix Union High School, Phoenix (1982)
St. Johns Indian School, Laveen/Komatke (1976)
St. Paul's Preparatory Academy, Phoenix (December 2009)
Scottsdale High School, Scottsdale (1983)
Sierra Summit Academy, Hereford (2011)
Sinagua High School, Flagstaff (2010)
Southwest Indian School, Peoria (1982)
Suffolk Hills Catholic High School, Tucson (1971–90; reverted to the Immaculate Heart High School name)
Vicki A. Romero High School, Phoenix (2012)
West High School, Phoenix (1983, reopened 1985 as Metro Tech High School)
Western Christian High School, Phoenix (1988)
Westwind Preparatory Academy (2015)
White Cone High School, Keams Canyon (2012)

See also
List of private and independent schools in Arizona

References

High
Arizona